The United Kingdom Antarctic Heritage Trust (UKAHT) is a British charity, registered in 1993 and re-registered in 2015. The UKAHT is a member of the Antarctic Heritage Trust coalition. The UKAHT's Patron is Princess Anne, The Princess Royal.

The organization's stated goals are as follows:
Help conserve selected early British scientific bases on the Antarctic Peninsula and South Georgia region for the enjoyment and education of visitors. The UKAHT operates Port Lockroy, which is designated Historic Site and Monument (No. 61) under the Antarctic Treaty;
Support the New Zealand Antarctic Heritage Trust in conserving the historic huts in the Ross Sea area built by the explorers Scott, Shackleton and Borchgrevink;
Promote an educational programme to stimulate public interest in science, the global environment and Antarctic research through the inspiration of earlier British Antarctic endeavors;
Help with the acquisition and preservation of British historical Antarctic artefacts.

Projects
Port Lockroy (Historic Site No. 61 under the Antarctic Treaty) is operated as a museum and post office (on behalf of the Foreign and Commonwealth Office) by UK Antarctic Heritage Trust during the austral summer.  Proceeds from the gift shop fund the repair and conservation of this site and others on the Antarctic Peninsula.

In 2004, the New Zealand Antarctic Heritage Trust began a comprehensive restoration project in the Ross Sea region of Antarctica, focussing on huts belonging to explorers of the region.  Although the New Zealand branch of the Trust has operational responsibility for the project, the UK Trust is a supporter of the efforts which include the preservation of huts belonging to Sir Ernest Shackleton and Robert Falcon Scott (both British explorers).

References

 

 "British Antarctic Survey: Port Lockroy Station ", Natural Environment Research Council, Retrieved 2010-April-25
 "UK Antarctic Heritage Trust web site ", Retrieved 2010-April-25

External links

British Antarctic Territory
Nature conservation organisations based in the United Kingdom
1993 establishments in the United Kingdom
Organizations established in 1993
United Kingdom and the Antarctic
Charities based in Cambridgeshire